The Commander of the Royal Canadian Air Force (French: commandant de l'Aviation royale canadienne) is the institutional head of the Royal Canadian Air Force.  This appointment also includes the title Chief of the Air Force Staff and is based at National Defence Headquarters in Ottawa, Ontario.

History of the position
With the creation of the Canadian Aviation Corps in 1914, a provisional commander was appointed.  This small and short-lived organization was dissolved in 1915 and it was not until 1918 that the Canadian Air Force came into being under the authority of its Officer Commanding.  The Canadian Air Force was reconstituted in 1920 and the officer in command (Air Commodore Tylee) held the title of Air Officer Commanding.  It was also from 1920 to 1922 that Air Vice-Marshal Sir Willoughby Gwatkin served as Inspector-General of the Canadian Air Force although formally command was held by Tylee.  Tylee's successors, not being air officers, only held the title of Officer Commanding.  In 1922, the senior Air Force post was redesignated as the Director and in 1924, when the Canadian Air Force was granted its Royal prefix, the officer appointed to command the Air Force continued to hold the title of Director.

From 1932 to 1938 the title of Senior Air Officer was used. In late 1938, the Air Force became an independent service and its professional head was retitled Chief of the Air Staff, bringing the Canadian higher command arrangements and nomenclature into line with that of the British and Australian air forces. The title of Chief of the Air Staff was used throughout World War II and well into the Cold War years.  However, in 1964, the post was abolished as part of a plan to integrate the Canadian Forces and authority over aviation units was no longer vested in a single post. Air Defence Command and Air Transport Commands continued as before but with no overall air commander, while the Canadian Air Division, Air Training and Air Materiel were all divided up between Mobile and Maritime Commands. This arrangement was eventually judged to be impractical and in 1975 the air units of the Canadian Forces were placed within Air Command under the authority of a lieutenant-general with the title Commander of Air Command.  In 1997 the Commander of Air Command was re-designated the Chief of the Air Staff, a title which continued in use until 2011. In 2011 Air Command was renamed the Royal Canadian Air Force at which time the appointment was renamed to its present incarnation.

Evolution of the position

Appointees
The following table lists all those who have held the post of Commander of the Royal Canadian Air Force or its preceding positions. Ranks and honours are as at the completion of their tenure:

|-style="text-align:center;"
!colspan=6|Provisional Commander

|-style="text-align:center;"
!colspan=6|Officer Commanding

|-style="text-align:center;"
!colspan=6|Air Officer Commanding

|-style="text-align:center;"
!colspan=6|Officer Commanding

|-style="text-align:center;"
!colspan=6|Director

|-style="text-align:center;"
!colspan=6|Senior Air Officer

|-style="text-align:center;"
!colspan=6|Chief of the Air Staff

|-style="text-align:center;"
!colspan=6|Commander of Air Command

|-style="text-align:center;"
!colspan=6|Chief of the Air Staff

|-style="text-align:center;"
!colspan=6|Chief of the Air Force Staff and Commander of the Royal Canadian Air Force

See also

 Chief of the Defence Staff, the second most senior member of the Canadian Armed Forces after the Commander-in-Chief
 Commander of the Royal Canadian Navy, the institutional head of the Royal Canadian Navy.
 Commander of the Canadian Army, the institutional head of the Canadian Army.

Notes

References
 Johnson, Vic. "Canada's Air Force Then and Now". Airforce magazine. Vol. 22, No. 3. 1998. ISSN 0704-6804.

External links
 The Armed Forces of Canada 1867-1967 p. 271

Military appointments of Canada
Royal Canadian Air Force
Canada